Henry Morley Fraser (June 15, 1922 – June 28, 2004) was an American football and baseball coach.  He was served as the head football coach at Albion College from 1954 to 1968.  Fraser died from leukemia in June 2004 at age 82.  Fraser's overall record in 15 years as a college football head coach is 81–41–1.

Morley served as a captain in the United States Navy during World War II.  He was a native of Milwaukee, Wisconsin, and a graduate of Washburn University in Topeka, Kansas, and Michigan State University in East Lansing, Michigan.  Morley began his coaching career in  1949 at Newberry High School in Newberry, Michigan.  After three consecutive undefeated seasons at Newberry, he moved to Eastern High School in Lansing Michigan, where he stayed for two seasons before he was hired at Albion.

He became a motivational speaker after retiring as Albion's football coach.

Head coaching record

College football

References

1922 births
2004 deaths
Albion Britons baseball coaches
Albion Britons football coaches
High school football coaches in Michigan
United States Navy officers
United States Navy personnel of World War II
Washburn University alumni
People from Albion, Michigan
Sportspeople from Milwaukee
Military personnel from Michigan